Bertino is an Italian surname. Notable people with the surname include:

 Al Bertino (1912–1996), American animator
 Bryan Bertino (born 1977), American film director, producer and screenwriter
 Claus Bertino (born 1980), Danish boxer
 Elisa Bertino, Italian computer scientist
 Joseph R. Bertino (1930), American researcher in the cancer pharmacology program 
 Marie-Helene Bertino, American novelist and short story writer
 Tom Bertino, American animator

See also
 Jennifer Bertino-Tarrant
 Niia (born Niia Bertino), American singer, pianist, and songwriter

Italian-language surnames